Moldova participated in the Eurovision Song Contest 2022 in Turin, Italy, with the song "" performed by the band Zdob și Zdub and the Advahov Brothers. The Moldovan broadcaster TeleRadio-Moldova (TRM) selected the Moldovan entry for the 2022 contest by organising a live audition in 29 January 2022, where "" was selected by an expert jury.

Moldova was drawn to compete in the first semi-final of the Eurovision Song Contest which took place on 10 May 2022. Performing during the show in position 9, "" was announced among the top 10 entries of the first semi-final and therefore qualified to compete in the final on 14 May. It was later revealed that Moldova placed eighth out of the 17 participating countries in the semi-final with 154 points. In the final, Moldova performed in position 19 and placed seventh out of the 25 participating countries, scoring 253 points, 239 of them which came from the public televote.

Background

Prior to the 2022 contest, Moldova had participated in the Eurovision Song Contest sixteen times since its first entry in 2005. To this point, Moldova have achieved another three top ten placings at the contest: in  where "Boonika bate toba" performed by Zdob și Zdub placed sixth, in  where "Fight" performed by Natalia Barbu placed tenth, and in  where "My Lucky Day" performed by DoReDoS also placed tenth.

For the 2022 Contest, the Moldovan national broadcaster, TeleRadio-Moldova (TRM), broadcast the event within Moldova and organised the selection process for the nation's entry. TRM confirmed their intentions to participate at the 2022 Eurovision Song Contest on 20 October 2021. Moldova has selected their entry via a national selection show between 2008 and 2020, while their entry in 2021 was selected via an internal selection. A selection show was to be held on 5 March 2022 to select Moldova's entry, but on 28 January 2022 it was revealed the entry will be selected during the auditions following the cancellation of the final due to COVID-19 restrictions.

Before Eurovision

Artist selection 
Artists and composers had the opportunity to submit their entries between 20 December 2021 and 24 January 2022. Artists could submit more than one song, and an international act was allowed to compete only if they were part of a duo or group where 50% of the lead vocalists were of Moldovan nationality. Songwriters could hold any nationality. On 25 January 2022, "Intro" performed by Misscatylove was withdrawn from the selection. A selection show named  was to be held on 5 March 2022 to select Moldova's entry, with an audition round to be held on 29 January 2022 to select the entries to compete in the final. However, on 28 January 2022, it was revealed that the entry will be selected during the auditions following the cancellation of the planned national selection due to COVID-19 restrictions.

The live audition round took place on 29 January 2022 at the TRM Studio 2 in Chișinău and an expert jury selected "" performed by Zdob și Zdub and Frații Advahov as the Moldovan entry for the Eurovision Song Contest 2022. The auditions were broadcast on Moldova 1, Moldova 2 and Radio Moldova as well as online via trm.md and via TRM's Facebook and YouTube pages. Entries were assessed on criteria such as voice quality and strength of the composition. The jury panel that evaluated the songs consisted of Geta Burlacu (singer, 2008 Moldovan Eurovision entrant), Vali Boghean (singer-songwriter), Cristina Scarlat (singer, 2014 Moldovan Eurovision entrant), Victoria Cușnir (journalist) and Aliona Moon (singer, 2013 Moldovan Eurovision entrant).

Preparation 
Following the selection of the Moldovan entry, Vasile Advahov of the Advahov Brothers revealed that changes would be made to "" including added English lyrics. On 27 March, Zdob și Zdub and the Advahov Brothers was a guest during the Moldova 1 programme  where they performed the final version of the song.

Promotion 
Zdob și Zdub and the Advahov Brothers made several appearances across Europe to specifically promote "" as the Moldovan Eurovision entry. On 5 March, the artists performed the Moldovan entry as a guest during the final of the Romanian Eurovision national final. On 7 April, the artists performed during the Israel Calling event held at the Menora Mivtachim Arena in Tel Aviv, Israel. On 9 April, the artists performed during the Eurovision in Concert event which was held at the AFAS Live venue in Amsterdam, Netherlands and hosted by Cornald Maas and Edsilia Rombley. On 16 April, the artists performed during the PrePartyES 2022 event which was held at the Sala La Riviera venue in Madrid, Spain and hosted by Ruth Lorenzo.

At Eurovision 

According to Eurovision rules, all nations with the exceptions of the host country and the "Big Five" (France, Germany, Italy, Spain and the United Kingdom) are required to qualify from one of two semi-finals in order to compete for the final; the top ten countries from each semi-final progress to the final. The European Broadcasting Union (EBU) split up the competing countries into six different pots based on voting patterns from previous contests, with countries with favourable voting histories put into the same pot. On 25 January 2022, an allocation draw was held which placed each country into one of the two semi-finals, as well as which half of the show they would perform in. Moldova was placed into the first semi-final, which was held on 10 May 2022, and was scheduled to perform in the first half of the show.

Once all the competing songs for the 2022 contest had been released, the running order for the semi-finals was decided by the shows' producers rather than through another draw, so that similar songs were not placed next to each other.

The two semi-finals and the final were televised in Moldova on Moldova 1 as well as broadcast via radio on Radio Moldova. All broadcasts featured commentary by Ion Jalbă and Daniela Crudu. The Moldovan spokesperson, who announced the top 12-point score awarded by the Moldovan jury during the final, was Elena Băncilă.

Semi-final

Zdob și Zdub and Advahov Brothers took part in technical rehearsals on 30 April and 4 May, followed by dress rehearsals on 9 and 10 May. This included the jury show on 9 May where the professional juries of each country watched and voted on the competing entries.

The Moldovan performance featured the members of Zdob și Zdub dressed in colourful outfits and the Advahov Brothers dressed in white suits with black patterns and lines. The LED screen projected ethnic patterns that resemble a train map with the stage waterfall lit in yellow and green colours and the secondary stage featuring light and strobe effects throughout.

At the end of the show, Moldova was announced as having finished in the top 10 and subsequently qualifying for the grand final. It was later revealed that Moldova placed eighth in the semi-final, receiving a total of 154 points: 135 points from the televoting and 19 points from the juries.

Final
Shortly after the second semi-final, a winners' press conference was held for the ten qualifying countries. As part of this press conference, the qualifying artists took part in a draw to determine which half of the grand final they would subsequently participate in. This draw was done in the order the countries appeared in the semi-final running order. Moldova was drawn to compete in the second half. Following this draw, the shows' producers decided upon the running order of the final, as they had done for the semi-finals.

Zdob și Zdub and the Advahov Brothers once again took part in dress rehearsals on 13 and 14 May before the final, including the jury final where the professional juries cast their final votes before the live show. They performed a repeat of their semi-final performance during the final on 14 May. Moldova placed seventh in the final, scoring 253 points: 239 points from the televoting and 14 points from the juries.

Voting 

Below is a breakdown of points awarded to Moldova during the first semi-final and final. Voting during the three shows involved each country awarding two sets of points from 1-8, 10 and 12: one from their professional jury and the other from televoting. The exact composition of the professional jury, and the results of each country's jury and televoting were released after the final; the individual results from each jury member were also released in an anonymised form. The Moldovan jury consisted of Adriano Marian, Cristina Scarlat, who represented Moldova in the Eurovision Song Contest 2014, Ilona Stepanov, Natan, and Radmila Popovici. In the first semi-final, Moldova finished in eighth place out of seventeen entries, marking Moldova's second consecutive qualification to the grand final.

Points awarded to Moldova

Points awarded by Moldova

Detailed voting results
The following members comprised the Moldovan jury:
 Adriano Marian – Conductor
 Cristina Scarlat – Singer, represented Moldova in the Eurovision Song Contest 2014
 Ilona Stepanov – Conductor
 Natan – Singer
 Radmila Popovici – Lyricist

References 

2022
Countries in the Eurovision Song Contest 2022
Eurovision